Military Psychology is a peer-reviewed academic journal published by the American Psychological Association on behalf of APA Division 19. The journal covers psychological research or practice in a military context, including  clinical and health psychology, training and human factors, manpower and personnel, social and organizational systems, and testing and measurement. The current editor-in-chief is Armando X. Estrada (Washington State University Vancouver).

Abstracting and indexing 
The journal is abstracted and indexed in:

According to the Journal Citation Reports, the journal has a 2016 impact factor of 0.734, ranking it 91st out of 128 journals in the category "Psychology, Multidisciplinary".

References

External links 
 

American Psychological Association academic journals
English-language journals
Publications established in 1989
Bimonthly journals
Occupational psychology journals